Thomas Whitesides (7 September 1836 – 24 September 1919) was an Australian cricketer. He played two first-class matches for Tasmania between 1858 and 1869.

See also
 List of Tasmanian representative cricketers

References

External links
 

1836 births
1919 deaths
Australian cricketers
Tasmania cricketers
Cricketers from Hobart